Knighthood is a free-to-play, turn-based strategy game developed by Midoki and currently published by Phoenix Games, previously King, in which the player controls a warrior, fighting through levels to gain armour, weapons and other RPG style loot. Knighthood was globally released on February 26, 2020 and is still currently being updated, and has been downloaded over a million times on Google Play as of October 2021.

Plot 
Rage Knights, heroes to the people, once defended the world. Now, it is controlled and corrupted by the power of Dark Ones. Once-good knights have turned evil. Sir Edward Drakeson is recruiting new knights to fight for the knighthood. The player must fight him to test your skills and three more like him for the knight trials. Sir Drakeson and the other three knights fought Lord Karnon, and they lost. The player finds four knights getting attacked and you fight Lord Karnon. The player wins the fight but Lord Karnon activates the portal behind him; Sir Drakeson punches the portal to make it unstable, so it can't be used properly, then Sir Drakeson gets sucked and trapped in the portal, then Lord Karnon jumps inside after him.

Gameplay 
Knighthood is a single-player game with some online aspects, in which the player battles enemies to progress through Astellan and claim the Rage Gauntlet. Unlike many other strategy-RPGs, the player has four energy bars; each attack consumes one bar, so the player can switch between using punches from the gauntlet, and attacking with their current weapon. Throughout Knighthood, the player comes across shops and hunts which helps with progression through the game.

Awards 
At the beginning of 2021, Knighthood won the Pocket Gamer Award for "Best RPG"

References 

2020 video games
Android (operating system) games
Fantasy video games
Free-to-play video games
IOS games
Role-playing video games
Video games developed in the United Kingdom
King (company) games
Single-player video games